Dominique Chauvelot (born 18 June 1952) is a French former athlete who competed in the 1972 Summer Olympics and in the 1976 Summer Olympics.

References

1952 births
Living people
French male sprinters
Olympic athletes of France
Athletes (track and field) at the 1972 Summer Olympics
Athletes (track and field) at the 1976 Summer Olympics
European Athletics Championships medalists
Mediterranean Games gold medalists for France
Athletes (track and field) at the 1975 Mediterranean Games
Mediterranean Games medalists in athletics
20th-century French people
21st-century French people